The Devon and Cornwall Longwool is a British breed of domestic sheep from South West England. It was created in 1977 through merger of two local breeds, the Devon Longwool and the South Devon.

Characteristics 

The wool is long and forms curls or ringlets, covering the head and legs as well as the body. The face is white, with black nostrils.

Use 

It is a productive provider of wool, and may give the heaviest fleece of any British breed. Fleece weight is usually in the range , but weights over  have been recorded. Lambs may be shorn at about six months; the lambswool is much sought after.

References 

Sheep breeds
Sheep breeds originating in England
Devon